Liolaemus atacamensis (Atacama tree iguana) is a species of lizard in the family Liolaemidae. It is endemic to Chile, with occurrence noted in the Chilean matorral.

References

 C. Michael Hogan & World Wildlife Fund. 2013. Chilean matorral. ed. M.McGinley. Encyclopedia of Earth. National Council for Science and the Environment. Washington DC
 World Conservation Monitoring Centre 1996.    2006 IUCN Red List of Threatened Species.   Downloaded on 28 July 2007.
The Reptile Database: Liolaemus atacamensis

atacamensis
Endemic fauna of Chile
Lizards of South America
Reptiles of Chile
Chilean Matorral
Atacama Desert
Reptiles described in 1933
Taxa named by Lorenz Müller
Taxa named by Walter Hellmich